The Provincial Council of Utrecht is the provincial council for the Dutch province of Utrecht. It forms the unicameral legislature of the province. Its 47 seats are distributed every four years in provincial elections. Since 2019, it is chaired by Hans Oosters (PvdA).

Current composition
Since the 2019 provincial elections, the distribution of seats of the Provincial Council of Utrecht has been as follows:

See also
 Provincial politics in the Netherlands

References

External links
  

Politics of Utrecht (province)
Utrecht